Šipek may refer to:

 Šipek, Črnomelj, a village in Slovenia
 Šipek, Croatian surname
 Miro Šipek (born 1948), Croatian-Australian rifle shooting coach
 Stjepan Šipek (1942–2019), Croatian-American actor

Croatian surnames